The FIA Central European Zone Formula 3 is an open wheel racing series based in central and eastern Europe. The series has run since 1994 under Formula Libre rules as sub class of the FIA Central European Circuit Racing series with mainly older Formula Three cars and engines in use. Notable regular circuits include the Formula 1 circuits of Hungaroring and Red Bull Ring. 

According to article 23-B-4 of the FIA World Council Statutes (for Karting the CIK/FIA) accepted a Central European Zone. Members of this zone are: Albania, Austria, Bosnia and Herzegovina, Croatia, Czech Republic, Hungary, Italy, Macedonia, Montenegro, Poland, Serbia, Slovenia and Slovakia.

Champions

See also
Formula Three

References

External links
FIA Central European Zone Formula 3 official website

1994 establishments in Europe
Formula Three series